Fore or Foré  is a Kainantu-Goroka language spoken in the Goroka District of Eastern Highlands Province, Papua New Guinea.

Phonology 
The consonants of Fore are as follows:

All the dental consonants can vary to alveolar, except /t̪/ which is always dental. /p/, /t̪/, and /k/ are pronounced as /b/, /ɾ/, and /g/ between vowels. Velar consonants are labialized after rounded vowels. /j/ is often pronounced as a fricative /ʝ/.

Fore has six vowels:

It also has four diphthongs: ae, ao, ai, and au.

Fore has a pitch accent system. Each syllable is either accented or unaccented. Multiple accented syllables can occur in the same word, but they cannot be adjacent to each other.

External links 
 Paradisec includes collections with Fore language materials

References

Kainantu–Goroka languages
Languages of Eastern Highlands Province